Nayef Aguerd (born 30 March 1996) is a Moroccan professional footballer who plays as a centre-back for Premier League club West Ham United and the Morocco national team. He has also played for FUS Rabat, Dijon and Rennes.

Club career

Early career 
Aguerd began his footballing career with the Mohammed VI Football Academy, before moving to FUS Rabat in 2014. The player then played a season with the club amateurs before signing his first professional contract with FUS Rabat in Botola in 2014. During his first season with FUS Rabat, he was the runner-up of the 2015 Throne cup after losing the final against Olympique Club de Khouribga. On 15 February 2015, he scored his first goal for the team in a 3–1 victory against Wydad AC. On 3 March, he scored his first continental goal in a 1–1 draw against UMS de Loum.

Dijon 
After four seasons, he joined Dijon in Ligue 1. He made his professional debut with Dijon in a 4–0 win over Nice on 25 August 2018, scoring the first goal for his side on his debut.

Rennes 
On 14 August 2020, Aguerd signed a contract with Ligue 1 team Rennes from Dijon for an undisclosed fee believed to be between €4m and €5m. He scored his first goal for the club in a friendly against Nice; the game ended in a 3–2 loss. On 13 September 2020, Aguerd scored his first league goal in a 4–2 victory against Nîmes.

On 17 May 2021, He was placed 11th place in the Prix Marc-Vivien Foé as the best player who represents an African national football team in Ligue 1. On 19 August 2021, Aguerd scored a header, which marked his first European goal, in a 2–0 victory against Rosenborg. A week later, Aguerd scored again in the second leg against Rosenborg in the 2021–22 UEFA Europa Conference League play-off round. On 16 May 2022, Aguerd was placed 3rd as the best African player in Ligue 1 for the Prix Marc-Vivien Foé.

West Ham United
In June 2022, Aguerd signed for West Ham United on a five-year contract for a fee of £30 million. His fee was the fourth-highest paid by West Ham after those paid for Sébastien Haller, Felipe Anderson and Kurt Zouma. On July 16, Aguerd made his debut for the Hammers in a friendly against Reading, playing a total of 63 minutes of a 1–1 draw at the Madejski Stadium. In his second game, a pre-season friendly against Rangers on 19 July, Aguerd injured his ankle which required surgery. On 19 October, Aguerd returned back to training with the team three months after his injury. He made his competitive West Ham United debut on 27 October in a Europa Conference League game against Silkeborg, which West Ham won 1–0.

International career
Aguerd made his debut for the Morocco national team in a friendly 0–0 tie with Albania on 31 August 2016. Aguerd represented Morocco in the 2018 African Nations Championship, helping his country to achieve their first CHAN title. On 6 September 2021, Aguerd scored his first goal against Sudan in the 2022 FIFA World Cup qualification, he sent a sharp shot in the net from a cross.

He was later invited by Vahid Halilhodžić to represent Morocco in the 2021 Africa Cup of Nations. Nayef started all of his matches in the group stages. He scored an own-goal in a 2–2 draw against Gabon.

On 10 November 2022, he was named in Morocco's 23-man squad for the 2022 FIFA World Cup in Qatar. Aguerd played an important role in defence along with Romain Saïss and was instrumental in Morocco reaching the Semi-finals of the world Cup. However, he missed the decisive game against France due to injury and was withdrawn minutes before the game, despite having been mentioned in the official starting line-ups prior to the match.

Career statistics

Club

International goals 
Scores and results list Morocco's goal tally first.

Honours
FUS Rabat
Botola: 2015–16
Throne Cup runner-up: 2014–15

Morocco
African Nations Championship: 2018

Individual 
IFFHS CAF Men Team of The Year: 2020

Orders
Order of the Throne: 2022

References

External links
 Nayef Aguerd at West Ham United F.C.
 
 
 
 
 

1996 births
Living people
People from Kenitra
Moroccan footballers
Association football defenders
Mohammed VI Football Academy players
Fath Union Sport players
Dijon FCO players
Stade Rennais F.C. players
Ligue 1 players
Botola players
Moroccan expatriate footballers
Expatriate footballers in France
Moroccan expatriate sportspeople in France
2021 Africa Cup of Nations players
2022 FIFA World Cup players
Expatriate footballers in England
West Ham United F.C. players
Morocco youth international footballers
Morocco A' international footballers
Morocco international footballers
2018 African Nations Championship players
Moroccan expatriate sportspeople in England
Premier League players